Aimez-vous Brahms... (Do you like Brahms...) is a novel by Françoise Sagan, first published in 1959. It was published in English in 1960, and was made into a film under the title Goodbye Again in 1961 starring Ingrid Bergman and Anthony Perkins. It was also adapted (probably unofficially) as a Hindi film called Jahan Tum Le Chalo in 1999.

Summary 
At thirty-nine years old, Paule is a divorced interior designer. Roger, her lover, who is busy with important business, makes distant visits to her, which she awaits with a certain indolence. She is committed to this relationship, but also wishes to preserve her independence and freedom. Of course, she would sometimes like to go further with Roger, to get closer to him, instead of collecting adventures without a future.

At a turning point in her life, and ultimately dissatisfied, she meets Simon, the son of Mrs. Van Der Besh, a wealthy American customer. At 25 years of age, he is handsome, nonchalant, childish. He falls in love with Paule, courting her, falls passionately in love with her. Paule is touched by his attentions, but keeps her distance until the day he invites her to a Brahms concert given at the Salle Pleyel. Believing that she saw in him a being sensitive to music, she gives in and, for several weeks, accepts the passion that the young man offers her.

Paule soon realizes that her love for Roger is, despite everything, more precious to her. Confronted with society's disapproval of the age difference, she puts an end, not without sadness, to her relationship with Simon, envying him his violent and beautiful grief. However, she does not have the strength to burn bridges and sees the young man again, while establishing a more satisfying relationship with Roger.

Further reading 
Michel Guggenheim - "Aimez-vous Brahms: Solitude and the Quest for Happiness", Yale French Studies, No. 24

External links 
 Aimez vous Brahms? (Goodbye Again) (YouTube)

1959 French novels
French novels adapted into films
Johannes Brahms
Novels by Françoise Sagan
Novels based on music
Novels set in Paris
John Murray (publishing house) books